The University of Sannio (UNISANNIO) is a university located in Benevento, southern Italy. Founded in 1998 (being previously a part of the University of Salerno), the University of Sannio is organized in 4 faculties with almost 6,000 students and offers courses at undergraduate and postgraduate level in the fields of Law, Statistics, the Environment, Geology, Biology, Biotechnology, Civil Engineering, Computer Engineering, Energy Engineering, Electronic Engineering, Economics and Business Organization.

History
The University of Sannio began as a part of the University of Salerno. Initially, it was included in the four-year plan 1986–90. Through Rectorial decrees on September 10, 1990, the following departments were set up: the Faculty of Economic and Social Sciences (now Faculty of Economics) with the degree courses of Banking Economics, Financial Economics, Insurance Economics, and Statistics, the Faculty of Engineering with a degree course in Computer Engineering. In the three-year plan 1991–93, the Faculty of Science was set up with additional degree courses in Biology and Geology.

The Faculty of Economic and Social Sciences was managed by a Technical committee until 31 October 1994. The Faculty of Engineering was managed by the Faculty of Engineering of the University of Salerno. Since November 1, 1994 both Faculties have had an autonomous Faculty Board.

The Consortium for the Promotion of Culture and University Studies has contributed to the implementation of the university in Benevento and is still playing a major part in its promotion. This organisation was established in 1987 by the Chamber of Commerce, the Province of Benevento and the Town Hall of Benevento. Successively, other public Institutions have joined the Consortium. With the Ministerial Decree n.1524, of 29 December 1997, the University of Sannio was officially recognized and became autonomous as from 1 January 1998.

Since 2005, the University of Sannio is a partner of the Euro-Mediterranean Center for Climate Change (CMCC).

The University of Sannio is divided into 4 Faculties:

The  Faculty of Law includes the first level degree course in Actuarial and Statistical Science; the specialist course in Actuarial and Statistical Science; the magisterial course in Jurisprudence.
The Faculty of Engineering includes the first level degree courses in Information Engineering, Electronic Engineering, Civil Engineering, Energy Engineering; the specialist courses in Information Engineering, Electronic Engineering, Civil Engineering, Energy Engineering.
The Faculty of Economics and Business Sciences includes the first level degree courses in Economics, Management and Organisation; and the specialist courses in Economics and Management and in Economics and Governance.
The Faculty of Sciences includes degree courses in Biology, Geology and Biotechnology, and specialist courses in Biology, in Genetic Science and in Geological Science

See also 
 List of Italian universities
 Benevento
 BioGeM

External links
 University of Sannio Website 

Universities in Italy
University of Sannio
Educational institutions established in 1998
Buildings and structures in Benevento
Education in Campania
1998 establishments in Italy